The 1993 PPG Indy Car World Series season was the 15th national championship season of American open wheel racing sanctioned by CART under the name "IndyCar". The season consisted of 16 races. Nigel Mansell was the national champion as well as the Rookie of the Year. The 1993 Indianapolis 500 was sanctioned by USAC, but counted towards the CART points championship. Emerson Fittipaldi won the Indy 500, his second career victory in that event.

The biggest story going into the season involved Newman/Haas Racing. Nigel Mansell, the reigning Formula One World Champion switched from Formula One to the CART IndyCar Series. Mansell joined Newman/Haas Racing as teammate to Mario Andretti, taking the seat formerly held by Michael Andretti, who departed for one year to McLaren. Mansell came to the American open wheel series with considerable fanfare and huge media attention. He won the season-opener at Surfers Paradise, the first CART "rookie" to win his first start. At Phoenix, Mansell crashed during practice and was forced to sit out the race due to a back injury. At Indianapolis, he was leading the race with 16 laps to go when he was passed on a restart by Emerson Fittipaldi and Arie Luyendyk, and wound up third. He still won the Indy 500 Rookie of the Year award. Despite having missed the race at Phoenix, Mansell won five races (four of which were on ovals) en route to the CART championship.

After winning his third CART championship in 1992, Bobby Rahal entered the 1993 season driving the R/H chassis (formerly the Truesports chassis). He finished second at Long Beach, but struggled to get his car up to speed, and failed to qualify at Indianapolis. He would run the remainder of the season with a 1993 Lola chassis, but with no victories. He did however finish 4th in points.

Drivers and constructors 
 All teams competed with Goodyear tires.

Season Summary

Schedule

 Oval/Speedway
 Dedicated road course
 Temporary street circuit
Indianapolis was USAC-sanctioned but counted towards the PPG Indy Car title.

Race Results

Final Drivers standings

Nation's Cup 

 Top result per race counts towards Nation's Cup.

Chassis Constructor's Cup

Engine Manufacturer's Cup

Driver Breakdown 

 Rookie

See also
 1993 Indianapolis 500
 1993 Toyota Atlantic Championship season
 1993 Indy Lights season

Notes
With his title victory, Nigel Mansell became the first driver to win the CART Series in his rookie season.  He also became the first man in history to be the Formula One champion and the CART IndyCar champion at the same time.

References
 
 
 
 
 
 

Champ Car seasons
IndyCar
IndyCar